Main Balwaan is a 1986 Hindi-language Indian action film directed by Mukul S. Anand, starring Dharmendra, Mithun Chakraborty, Meenakshi Sheshadri, Utpal Dutt, Rita Bhaduri, Suresh Oberoi and Raza Murad.

Plot 

Main Balwaan portrays the story of an honest police officer who is caught in the web of human relationships and becomes the victim of a misunderstanding by his own protector. Anil (Suresh Oberoi) who is Meera's son marries Geeta (Rita Bhaduri) against his father's wish. When he brings her home, his family rejects them and they are thrown out. Anil dies, due to which Geeta goes mad and their son Tony (Mithun Chakraborty) is looked after by his maternal uncle, Chowdhary (Dharmendra) who is a police officer. Tony falls in love with Natasha, daughter of Basu, the Police Commissioner. Tony takes advantage of his uncle's honesty and extracts money from local shopkeepers and businessmen. When the British crown is stolen, Tony is the main suspect.

Cast 

Mithun Chakraborty	as Tony
Dharmendra	as Inspector Chowdhury
Meenakshi Sheshadri as Natasha
Suresh Oberoi as Anil, Tony's father
Ravi Baswani as Suleimann Dilwala
Rakesh Bedi as Gambler
Utpal Dutt as Police Commissioner Ajay Basu
Rita Bhaduri as Geeta, Tony's mother (credited as Reeta Bahaduri)
Utpal Dutt	as Police Commissioner Ajay Basu
Ram Mohan as Inspector Bulsara
Raza Murad	as Hira / Rai Bahadur
Tej Sapru as CBI Inspector Ranjit Kapoor
Satish Shah as Peter

Soundtrack 
'Pehle Rock 'N' Roll', sung by Kishore Kumar and 'No Entry', sung by Kishore Kumar and Nazia Hassan remain popular.

References

External links 
 http://ibosnetwork.com/asp/filmbodetails.asp?id=Main+Balwaan
 

1986 films
1980s Hindi-language films
Indian action films
Films directed by Mukul S. Anand
Films scored by Bappi Lahiri
1986 action films